Latina or Latinas most often refers to:

 Latinas, a demographic group in the United States
 Latino (demonym), a term used in the United States for people with cultural ties to Latin America.
Latin Americans

Latina and Latinas may also refer to:

Arts and entertainment
Latina (magazine), a monthly American magazine
Latina, an album by Cristina Pato
Latina (album), a 2016 album by Thalía
"Latina", a song on the 1967 album High Blues Pressure
"Latina", a song on the 1994 album Love Will Find a Way
"Latina", a song on the 2014 album TZN - The Best of Tiziano Ferro

Geography

Italy
Province of Latina, a province in Latium (Lazio), Italy
Latina, Lazio, the capital of the province of Latina
Latina Nuclear Power Plant
Valle Latina, a valley of Lazio, Italy, from south of Rome to Cassino

Spain
Latina (Madrid), a district of Madrid
Barrio de La Latina (Madrid), a neighbourhood of Madrid

Language and science
 or Latin, from the Latin name of the language
Latina (genus), a genus of parasitic wasps
Latina (architecture), the most common type of northern Indian shikhara (tower or spire on top of a shrine)

Sport
 Latina Calcio 1932, an Italian football club formerly known as Unione Sportiva Latina Calcio.

See also
 Latin (disambiguation)
 Latino (disambiguation)